Banalités (FP 107) is a set of five mélodies for voice and piano composed by Francis Poulenc in 1940 on poems by Guillaume Apollinaire (1880–1918).

History of the work 

Composed in 1940, the mélodies were premiered at salle Gaveau, on 14 December 1940, by Pierre Bernac (baritone) and the composer (piano).

Titles 
 Chanson d’Orkenise 
 Hôtel 
 Fagnes de Wallonie 
 Voyage à Paris 
 Sanglots

Source of the poems  
"Chanson d'Orkenise", "Fagnes de Wallonie" and "Sanglots" are taken from the collection Il y a (1925). 

"Hôtel", written in 1913, was published in the posthumous collection Le Guetteur mélancolique (1952).
"Voyage à Paris" was published in the Poèmes retrouvés from the Œuvres poétiques by Apollinaire in 1956.

Dedicatees 
"Chanson d'Orkenise" is dedicated to Claude Rostand, "Hôtel" to Marthe Bosredon, "Fagnes de Wallonie" to Ms. Henri Frédéricq, "Voyage à Paris" to Paul Éluard, and "Sanglots" to Suzette Chanlaire.

Discography 
 Pierre Bernac (baritone) and Francis Poulenc (piano) in 1950 (Naxos).
 1 and 2: Régine Crespin (soprano) and John Wustman (piano) in 1967 (Decca).
 Michel Piquemal (baritone) and Christine Lajarrige (piano) (Naxos).
 Véronique Gens (soprano) and Roger Vignoles (piano) (Erato).

Quote 
 One song by the band Pink Martini, "Sympathique", is inspired by the poem "Hotel" by Apollinaire and its setting to music by Poulenc.

References

External links 
 Banalités on IMSLP
 Pierre Bernac sings "Banalites" of Poulenc with Poulenc on YouTube

Mélodies
Compositions by Francis Poulenc
Guillaume Apollinaire
Music based on poems